Western Lombard is a group of dialects of Lombard, a Romance language spoken in Italy. It is widespread in the Lombard provinces of Milan, Monza, Varese, Como, Lecco, Sondrio, a small part of Cremona (except Crema and its neighbours), Lodi and Pavia, and the Piedmont provinces of Novara, Verbano-Cusio-Ossola, the eastern part of the Province of Alessandria (Tortona), a small part of Vercelli (Valsesia), and Switzerland (the Canton of Ticino and part of the Canton of Graubünden). After the name of the region involved, land of the former Duchy of Milan, this language is often referred to as Insubric (see Insubria and Insubres) or Milanese, or, after Clemente Merlo,  (literally "of this side of Adda River").

Western Lombard and Italian
In Italian-speaking contexts, Western Lombard is often incorrectly called a dialect of Italian. Western Lombard and Standard Italian are very different. Some speakers of Lombard varieties may have difficulty understanding one another and require a standard to communicate, but all Western Lombard varieties are mutually intelligible. Western Lombard is relatively homogeneous (much more so than Eastern Lombard), but it has a number of variations, mainly in relation to the vowels ,  and the development of  into .

Western Lombard has no official status in Lombardy or anywhere else. The only official language in Lombardy is Italian.

Grammar

The general lines of diachronics of Western Lombard plural declension are drawn here, with reference to Milanese orthography:

Feminine 
Most feminine words end with the inflection -a; the feminine plural is non-inflected (la legora / i legor ; la cadrega / i cadregh). The final vowel keeps its original length (non-final syllables have no difference), which is often long when it is followed by a voiced consonant and short when it is followed by a voiceless consonant. When the stem ends with a particular consonant cluster, there can be the addition of a final -i or of a schwa between consonants (for example: in Milanese sing. scendra, plur. scendr > scender). For adjectives, the plural form and masculine form are often the same.

Masculine 
Most masculine nouns lack inflections, and the plural masculine is always non-inflected (el tramvaj/i tramvaj; el lett/i lett ). When the word stem ends with a particular group of consonants, both singular and plural forms can add a schwa between consonants; otherwise, a final -o (pron. /u/) is added to singular nouns, -i for plurals.

Masculine words ending in -in or, less commonly, in -ett, have plurals in -itt (fiolin/fiolitt). Those ending in -ll have plurals in -j, (el sidell/i sidej ; el porscell/i porscej ; el cavall / i cavaj). The same occurs in the determinate article: singular ell > el, plural elli > ej > i.

Masculine words ending in -a are invariable and are proper nouns, words from Ancient Greek or idiomatic words such as pirla, a derogatory term for a person.

Varieties
Western Lombard can be divided into four main varieties: lombardo alpino (spoken in the provinces of Sondrio and of Verbania, Sopraceneri of Canton Ticino and Grigioni in Switzerland), lombardo-prealpino occidentale (spoken in the provinces of Como, Varese and Lecco, Lugano and its neighbors in Canton Ticino), basso-lombardo occidentale (Pavia and Lodi), and macromilanese (provinces of Milan, Monza, Novara and Valsesia of Vercelli). The boundaries are obviously schematic, since the political division in provinces and municipalities are usually independent from languages spoken.

Examples of Western Lombard language are:

Milanese or Meneghin (macromilanese)
Bustocco and Legnanese
Brianzöö (lombardo-prealpino occidentale - macromilanese)
Monzese
Comasco-Lecchese (lombardo-prealpino occidentale)
Comasco
Laghée
Intelvese
Vallassinese
Lecchese
Valsassinese
Ossolano
Varesino or Bosin (lombardo-prealpino occidentale)
Alpine Lombard (lombardo alpino, influence from Ladin)
Valtellinese
Chiavennasco
Ticinese (lombardo alpino) (influence from Ladin)
Southwestern Lombard (basso-lombardo occidentale)
Paves (influences from Emilian-Romagnol, Piedmontese, and Ligurian)
Ludesan (influence from Emilian)
Nuaresat (lombardo-prealpino occidentale - macromilanese)
Cremunéez (influence from Emilian-Romagnol)
Slangs
Spasell

Phonology 
The following information is based on the Milanese dialect:

Consonants 

  occurs only as a nasal sound before velar stops.
 The central approximant sounds  are mainly heard as allophones of  when preceding vowels.
  is not typically pronounced, and only occurs in a few words from Italian.

Vowels 

Orthography
The most important orthography in Western Lombard literature is the Classical Milanese orthography.
It was used by Carlo Porta (1775–1821) and Delio Tessa (1886–1939). It was perfected by the Circolo Filologico di Milano. Other orthographies are the Ticinese, the Comasca, the Bosina, the Nuaresat, and the Lecchese.

Literature
An extensive Western Lombard literature is available. Texts include various dictionaries, a few grammars, and a recent translation of the Gospels.

See also 
 Languages of Italy
 Milanese
 Insubric literature
 Romance languages

References

Bibliography 
 Andrea Rognoni, Grammatica dei dialetti della Lombardia, Oscar Mondadori, 2005.
 AA. VV., Parlate e dialetti della Lombardia. Lessico comparato, Mondadori, Milano 2003.

Western Lombard language
Endangered Romance languages